Modern primitives or urban primitives are people in developed, or modern nations who engage in body modification rituals and practices inspired by the ceremonies, rites of passage, or bodily ornamentation in what they consider traditional cultures. These practices may include body piercing, tattooing, play piercing, flesh hook suspension, corset training, scarification, branding, and cutting. The stated motivation for engaging in these varied practices may be personal growth, personal rites of passage, rejection of society, as a way to connect with antiquity, or spiritual and sexual curiosity.

Origins 
Roland Loomis, also known by his chosen name, Fakir Musafar, was one of the founders of the modern primitive movement. The 1989 RE/Search book Modern Primitives is largely responsible for the promotion of the concept of modern primitivism. Among the modern primitive motivations, the main purpose of any rite of passage is to transform the adherent's state of being, from one state of existence to another. Modern primitives identify with a connection between what they see as "the primitive" and authenticity; "in opposition to the corruptions of mainstream society".

Modern primitives may have a loose set of beliefs about their way of life, including
 Modification of the body in order to sculpt their self-image.
 Activities which reject society at large. Exploring the self is a personal statement, which society rejects.
 Resisting what they see as colonialism, and identification with anticolonial struggles.

Criticisms 
Urban primitivism has been suggested as cultural appropriation and misrepresenting or "bundling" cultures together in a "primitive" setting. These have been debated, with adherents believing that these criticisms are based largely on the views of Roland Loomis rather than the culture as a whole.

See also
 Noble savage
 Paleolithic diet

References

Further reading

External links

 
Cultural appropriation
Body piercing
Tattooing
Sexuality and gender identity-based cultures
Lifestyles